Çarxan (also, Çarhan, Chargan, and Charkhan) is a village and municipality in the Shamakhi Rayon of Azerbaijan.  It has a population of 2,600.

References 

Populated places in Shamakhi District